National Honey Month is a celebratory and promotional event held annually during the month of September in the United States.

Its purpose is to promote American beekeeping, the beekeeping industry, and honey as a natural and beneficial sweetener.

September is significant for honey producers as it is the month that marks the end of the honey collection season for many beekeepers in the United States.

History
The awareness month was initiated by The National Honey Board, a United States Department of Agriculture (USDA) founded and overseen organization. (a US government established, USDA-overseen, organization) in 1989.

See also

References

External links
 About the National Honey Board
 Benefits of honey

Beekeeping in the United States
Month-long observances
Honey
September observances
Observances about food and drink
Agricultural organizations based in the United States
United States Department of Agriculture programs
1989 establishments in the United States
Recurring events established in 1989